The Ministry of Petroleum  is a ministry of the Government of South Sudan. The incumbent minister is  Puot Kang Chol. ,  the ministry of petroleum  contributes more than 90% of the south Sudan total income through oil production and exportation to different countries through north Sudan pipe line from the oil fields in South Sudan to the Port Sudan in Red Sea. the government of Sudan is heavily taxing South Sudan for using the pipe line, and with the recent declined in the oil prices in the international market, this declined in the oil prices has really affected the economy of the country. In June 2021, the ministry launched its first Oil licensing round in Juba.  According to new studies assigned by the ministry, approximately 90% of the country's Oil and gas reserves remain unexplored.

List of Ministers of Petroleum 

Major Players of South Sudan petroleum

 Nile Petroleum cooperation 
 Petroleum Nasional Berhad (Petronas)
 Akon Refinery company Ltd.
 China National Petroleum cooperation

References

Petroleum
South Sudan, Petroleum
South Sudan, Petroleum
Energy ministries